The WWP Heavyweight World Championship was a professional wrestling world heavyweight championship in the South African professional wrestling promotion World Wrestling Professionals (WWP), contested exclusively among Heavyweight (>=) wrestlers. It was created in April 2004 when WWP debuted its television show, WWP Thunderstrike. Tornado has had the longest reign.

Title history

See also

World Wrestling Professionals

References

External links

World Wrestling Professionals championships
World heavyweight wrestling championships